Dear Wormwood is the second album by American folk rock band The Oh Hellos, released October 16, 2015. It was written, produced, and performed primarily by siblings Tyler and Maggie Heath, with the exception of "Danse Macabre", which was composed by Camille Saint-Saëns in 1874. The mixing and mastering was done by Charlie Kramsky, with extra vocals being recorded by members of the ensemble that tours with the duo, including Matthew Hagerman and Joey Chance.

Background 
The album takes its title from The Screwtape Letters by C. S. Lewis, which has every chapter of the book begin with the words "Dear Wormwood,". It draws further inspiration from the book by framing each song as a letter from someone in an abusive or unhealthy relationship to their abuser, reversing how the book was composed of letters trying to teach one demon how to lead a particular human astray. The songs vary in tone from lovingly addressed to determined to escape the relationship. It also draws inspiration from The Kingkiller Chronicle by Patrick Rothfuss, with the descriptions of literature, language, and music being an influence on the way the album was written. It's described as a sequel to their first LP Through the Deep, Dark Valley, with the first album concerning where the speaker of the album has been, and Dear Wormwood dealing with the speaker having to pick up and move on from where he left off.

Critical reception and response 

Dear Wormwood peaked at #134 on Billboard 200 and stayed there for a week.

Neil Z. Yeung gave the album 3.5 stars out of 5, saying that "These songs are heavy on the drama, but the conviction with which the band delivers each one borders on glorious rapture." Brandon Easley of Glide Magazine gave Dear Wormwood an 8/10, calling the album "a fantastic recording that is easy to share,".

Track listing

References 

Elektra Records albums
2016 albums
The Oh Hellos albums